Yeongnam (Hangul: 영남, ; literally "south of the passes") is a region that coincides with the former Gyeongsang Province in what is now South Korea.

The region includes the modern-day provinces of North and South Gyeongsang and the self-governing cities of Busan, Daegu, and Ulsan. The regional name is used (with a slightly different spelling) as the name of Yeungnam University.

See also
Regions of Korea
Yeongdong
Honam
Geography of South Korea

External links

Regions of Korea